Post-antibiotic may refer to:
 Antibiotic resistance
 Post Antibiotic Effect